= Giannis Fronimidis =

Greek footballer

Personal information
- Date of birth: 22 April 1937 (age 89)
- Position: Goalkeeper

International career
Years	Team	Apps	(Gls)
1965	Greece	1	(0)

Giannis Fronimidis (born 22 April 1937) is a Greek footballer. He played in one match for the Greece national football team in 1965.
